Thorntown is a town in Sugar Creek Township, Boone County, Indiana. The population was 1,520 at the time of the 2010 census. Thorntown is located in northwestern Boone County, about halfway between Lafayette and Indianapolis.

History
The first permanent settlement at Thorntown was made in 1827. A post office was established at Thorntown in 1830. Thorntown was platted in 1831. Thorntown is the English translation for the name of a former Native American village located there.

The Thorntown Public Library was listed on the National Register of Historic Places in 1986.

Geography
Thorntown is located at  (40.128757, -86.608762).

Demographics

2010 census
As of the census of 2010, there were 1,520 people, 556 households, and 422 families living in the town. The racial makeup of the town was 99.1% White, 0.1% African American, 0.2% Native American, 0.1% from other races, and 0.5% from two or more races. Hispanic or Latino of any race were 0.7% of the population.

There were 556 households, of which 37.1% had children under the age of 18 living with them, 51.4% were married couples living together, 16.9% had a female householder with no husband present, 7.6% had a male householder with no wife present, and 24.1% were non-families. 20.7% of all households were made up of individuals, and 11.7% had someone living alone who was 65 years of age or older. The average household size was 2.73 and the average family size was 3.10.

The median age in the town was 37.5 years. 26% of residents were under the age of 18; 10.7% were between the ages of 18 and 24; 22.6% were from 25 to 44; 27.8% were from 45 to 64; and 13% were 65 years of age or older. The gender makeup of the town was 47.8% male and 52.2% female.

2000 census
As of the census of 2000, there were 1,562 people, 589 households, and 444 families living in the town. The racial makeup of the town was 97.57% White, 0.13% Asian, 1.47% from other races, and 0.83% from two or more races. Hispanic or Latino of any race were 1.98% of the population.

There were 589 households, out of which 37.4% had children under the age of 18 living with them, 59.9% were married couples living together, 11.0% had a female householder with no husband present, and 24.6% were non-families. 22.2% of all households were made up of individuals, and 10.4% had someone living alone who was 65 years of age or older. The average household size was 2.65 and the average family size was 3.07.

In the town, the population was spread out, with 29.3% under the age of 18, 7.2% from 18 to 24, 29.4% from 25 to 44, 21.0% from 45 to 64, and 13.0% who were 65 years of age or older. The median age was 36 years. For every 100 females, there were 95.0 males. For every 100 females age 18 and over, there were 87.8 males.

The median income for a household in the town was $38,289, and the median income for a family was $43,194. Males had a median income of $33,750 versus $24,524 for females. The per capita income for the town was $19,109. About 5.4% of families and 6.6% of the population were below the poverty line, including 6.4% of those under age 18 and 10.7% of those age 65 or over.

Government

The town is governed by a Town Board who oversees all sewage, electric, and police and fire service. The town board is also in charge of capital improvements and special projects such as road construction, signage, ordinance adoption, and administrating over the town court. There are five members of the board and a president is chosen from among them.

The town's fire service is provided by Thorntown-Sugar Creek Twp. Fire and ambulance service is provided by Witham Health Services.

The town's police department consists of four full-time police officers and anywhere between six and nine reserve officers. The town's police department falls under the Indiana town marshal system. The town uses three police vehicles and provides almost 24-hour service. The town's marshals are also in charge of collecting loose or stray animals as well as enforcing local ordinance and state laws. The officers have full police authority within anywhere in the state of Indiana as prescribed by law.

Notable people 
 William La Follette, member of the United States House of Representatives, was born in Thorntown.
 Paul Hutchens, author known for the Sugar Creek Gang book series
 Anson Mills, general and founder of El Paso, Texas
 William W. Rogers, major general in Marine Corps during World War II

References

External links

 Town of Thorntown, Indiana website

Towns in Boone County, Indiana
Towns in Indiana
Indianapolis metropolitan area